Aïn Kechra is a district in Skikda Province, Algeria. It is one of the 4 landlocked districts of this province which lies on the Mediterranean Sea. It was named after its capital, Aïn Kechra.

Municipalities
The district is further divided into 2 municipalities:
Aïn Kechra
Ouldja Boulbalot

Districts of Skikda Province